The 1974 BC Lions finished in third place in the Western Conference with an 8–8 record and appeared in the Western Semi-Final.

Running back Johnny Musso got injured early in the season and played only three games. However, backups Lou Harris and Monroe Eley took advantage of their opportunity. Harris had 1232 yards rushing, 532 receiving, league best 12 touchdowns and was named to the CFL all-star team. Eley also rushed for over a thousand yards (1176) giving the Lions one of the best single season running games in CFL history.

Don Moorhead continued to be the starting quarterback and threw for 2468 yards passing and 17 touchdown passes. However, Moorhead injured his knee and hand late in the season, and General Manager Jackie Parker traded for veteran quarterback Pete Liske in October as insurance. The Lions lost their final four games of the season, however, still made the final playoff spot via tiebreaker. In the Western Semi-Final, the Lions fell to Saskatchewan by a score of 24–14 (the Roughriders won all four games against the Lions in 1974).

Annis Stukus was elected to the Canadian Football Hall of Fame in the Builder category.

The Lions changed their jersey to short sleeves and all white numbers at home

Offseason

CFL Draft

Preseason

Regular season

Season standings

Season schedule

Playoffs

Offensive leaders

Awards and records

1974 CFL All-Stars
RB – Lou Harris, CFL All-Star
OG – Curtis Wester, CFL All-Star

References

BC Lions seasons
1974 Canadian Football League season by team
1974 in British Columbia